Brian Regan is an American screenwriter. He co-wrote the screenplays for 102 Dalmatians (for which he also co-wrote the story), How to Lose a Guy in 10 Days, and the yet-to-be-produced Shoe Addicts Anonymous.

References

External links

Living people
Year of birth missing (living people)
American male screenwriters
Place of birth missing (living people)